The Three Dances of Mary Wilford (German: Die drei Tänze der Mary Wilford) is a 1920 German silent drama film directed by Robert Wiene and starring Friedrich Feher, Erika Glässner and Ludwig Hartau. It is apparently a sequel to Director Léo Lasko's 1919 film, The Sinner (German: Die Sünderin).

Cast
 Friedrich Feher
 Erika Glässner
 Ludwig Hartau
 Reinhold Köstlin
 Hermann Vallentin

References

Bibliography
 Jung, Uli & Schatzberg, Walter. Beyond Caligari: The Films of Robert Wiene. Berghahn Books, 1999.

External links

Films of the Weimar Republic
1920 films
German silent feature films
German drama films
Films directed by Robert Wiene
1920 drama films
German black-and-white films
Silent drama films
1920s German films
1920s German-language films